Apollo Records may refer to: 

 Apollo Records (1921), US based company
 Apollo Records (1928), US based company
 Apollo Records (1944), US based company
 Apollo Records (Belgium), Belgian-based company
 Apollo Recordings, UK based company